Drupa (Drupa)  ricinus, common name : prickly spotted drupe,  is a species of sea snail, a marine gastropod mollusk in the family Muricidae, the murex snails or rock snails.

Subspecies
 Drupa (Drupa) ricinus lischkei (Hidalgo, 1904) (synonyms: Drupa (Drupa) ricinus lischkei (Hidalgo, 1904); Drupa hadari Emerson & Cernohorsky, 1973; Ricinula lischkei Hidalgo, 1904 (basionym) )
 Drupa (Drupa) ricinus ricinus (Linnaeus, 1758) (synonym: Drupa (Drupa) ricinus ricinus (Linnaeus, 1758) )
 Drupa ricinus albolabris (Blainville, 1832)
 Drupa ricinus arachnoidea (Lamarck, 1810)

Description

The shell size varies between 19 mm and 32 mm

Distribution
This species is distributed throughout the tropical Indo-Pacific and along the Galápagos Islands.

References

 Dautzenberg, P. (1923). Liste préliminaire des mollusques marins de Madagascar et description de deux espèces nouvelles. Journal de Conchyliologie 68: 21-74
 Dautzenberg, Ph. (1929). Mollusques testacés marins de Madagascar. Faune des Colonies Francaises, Tome III
 MacNae, W. & M. Kalk (eds) (1958). A natural history of Inhaca Island, Mozambique. Witwatersrand Univ. Press, Johannesburg. I-iv, 163 pp
 Houart R., Kilburn R.N. & Marais A.P. (2010) Muricidae. pp. 176–270, in: Marais A.P. & Seccombe A.D. (eds), Identification guide to the seashells of South Africa. Volume 1. Groenkloof: Centre for Molluscan Studies. 376 pp.
 Claremont M., Reid D.G. & Williams S.T. (2012) Speciation and dietary specialization in Drupa, a genus of predatory marine snails (Gastropoda: Muricidae). Zoologica Scripta 41: 137-149

External links
 

ricinus
Gastropods described in 1758
Taxa named by Carl Linnaeus